Alain Robidoux (born July 25, 1960) is a Canadian retired professional snooker player. Robidoux played on the sport's main tour from 1987 to 2004 and continues to play in events in Canada.

Career
He was born in Saint-Jérôme, Quebec and joined the pro circuit in the late 1980s, playing as a "non-tournament" professional. This entitled Robidoux to be listed on official rankings, although he could not play in most competitions. In 1988, Robidoux amassed enough points in the World Championship qualifiers to finish in the top 128 players, and thus allowing him to join the tour full-time.

In September 1988, Robidoux became only the sixth player ever to record an officially ratified 147 maximum break in the qualifiers for the European Open. The same month, he won his sole professional title, the Canadian Professional Championship. In October 1988 he reached the semi-finals of the Grand Prix, where he recovered from 0–7 down against Alex Higgins but ultimately lost the match 7–9.

In the first round of the 1996 World Championship, Robidoux was beaten 3–10 by Ronnie O'Sullivan in a controversial match. Although he is predominantly right-handed, O'Sullivan played a number of shots with his left hand. This behaviour was described by commentator John Virgo as O'Sullivan "taking the mick". The matter came to a crux in the eleventh frame, with Robidoux 2–8 down, declining to concede the frame, instead continuing to  despite a 43-point deficit with only the pink and black on the table. Robidoux refused to shake O'Sullivan's hand at the end of the match. O'Sullivan responded by claiming that he played better with his left hand than Robidoux could with his right. Robidoux would later apologize to O'Sullivan when it became obvious that the latter could play equally well with both hands and the two would become friends.

The 1996/97 season saw
Robidoux reaching his only ever final at the 1996 German Open; in another memorable encounter against Ronnie O'Sullivan, he lost 7–9, despite making a tournament-best 145 break. He also reached the semi-finals of the 1997 World Snooker Championship, defeating Brian Morgan, Stefan Mazrocis and Lee Walker before losing to eventual champion Ken Doherty. This was the peak of Robidoux's career, as he finished the season career-best 9th in the world rankings. The next season was a disaster as Robidoux failed to win a single match, and he subsequently slid rapidly down the rankings, before finally retiring in 2004. Robidoux blamed his decline on the destruction of his favourite cue, which he referred to as "the Eel". When Robidoux returned the cue to the man from whom he had bought it to have it mended, the man objected to Robidoux having 
fixed a sponsor's logo to the butt and smashed the cue to pieces. Several years later, Robidoux was asked whether the passage of time may have eased his anger towards the cue maker; he responded "I want to kill him."

Performance and rankings timeline

Career finals

Ranking finals: 1

Non-ranking finals: 1 (1 title)

Team finals: 1 (1 title)

Amateur finals: 7 (7 titles)

References

External links
 
 Snooker.org profile of Robidoux

Canadian snooker players
Canadian people of French descent
1960 births
People from Saint-Jérôme
Living people